Orso Maria Guerrini (born 25 October 1942) is an Italian film, television and stage actor and voice actor.

Life and career 
Born in Florence, Guerrini started his career with several small roles in Spaghetti Westerns and genre films.  He became first known in 1970 when he was chosen to play the main character in Anton Giulio Majano's E le stelle stanno a guardare.  
He then starred in dozens of films for cinema and television, as well as being active as a voice actor.

He is also a well known as spokesman for Birra Moretti.

Selected filmography 

 My Name Is Pecos (1966) - Clane Henchman (uncredited)
 Run, Man, Run (1968) - Raul
 Roma come Chicago (1968) - Lo Cascio
 Barbagia (La società del malessere) (1969)
 Eat It (1969)
 Lonely Hearts (1970)
 Situation Normal: A.F.U (1970)
 The Conformist (1970)
 A Man Called Sledge (1970)
 Waterloo (1970) - Officer
 The Assassin of Rome (1972) - Gianni Di Meo
 Il bacio di una morta (1974) - Conte Guido Rambaldi di Lampedusa
 Laure (1976) - Professor Gualtier Morgan
 The Testament of Arkadia (1976, TV Series) - Luke Ferro
 Rome Armed to the Teeth (1976) - Ferrender (uncredited)
 The Big Racket (1976) - Rossetti
 A Matter of Time (1976) - Gabriele d'Orazio
 Keoma (1976) - Butch Shannon
 Agonas horis telos (1978)
 Desideria: La vita interiore (1980) - Quinto
 La gatta da pelare (1981) - Prof. Maraldi
 Forest of Love (1981)
 18 anni tra una settimana (1991) - Ortensi
 L'Atlantide (1992) - Ben Cheikh
 First Action Hero (1994) - Tony Romeo
 Vendetta (1995) - Giuseppe Cortini
 Slave of Dreams (1995, TV Movie) - The Pharaoh
 Memsaab (1996)
 L'ombre du pharaon (1996)
 Double Team (1997) - Colony Resident
 Desert of Fire (1997, TV Mini-Series) - Al Khan
 The Eighteenth Angel (1997) - Paolo Pagano
 Annarè (1998) - L'esattore
 Alex l'ariete (2000) - Barra
 Un giudice di rispetto (2000) - Don Carmine Di Cristina
 Lo strano caso del signor Kappa (2001) - Senatore Versini
 The Bourne Identity (2002) - Giancarlo
 Amanti e Segreti (2004, TV Mini-Series) - Benedetto Ungari
 Countdown (2004) - Italian Prime Minister
 Il soffio dell'anima (2009) - Luna's Father
 Trappola d'autore (2009) - Omar Dimitri
 La meravigliosa avventura di Antonio Franconi (2011)
 Lacrime di San Lorenzo (2015) - Senator Verini
 Tiramisù (2016) - Boss
 Il crimine non va in pensione (2017) - Alfio il Generale

 Sin (2019) - Marchese Malaspina

References

External links 

 

Italian male film actors
Actors from Florence
1943 births
Italian male stage actors
Living people
Italian male television actors